Muscini is a Tribe of flies from the family Muscidae.

Genera
Archaeopolietes Pont & Carvalho, 1997
Biopyrellia Townsend, 1932
Dasyphora Robineau-Desvoidy, 1830
Eudasyphora Townsend, 1911
Mesembrina Meigen, 1826
Morellia Robineau-Desvoidy, 1830
Musca Linnaeus, 1758
Neomyia Walker, 1859
Neorypellia Pont, 1972
Parapyrellia Townsend, 1915
Polietes Rondani, 1866
Polietina Schnabl & Dziedzicki, 1911
Pyrellia Robineau-Desvoidy, 1830
Sarcopromusca Townsend, 1927
Trichomorellia Stein,  191
Xenomorellia Malloch, 1923

References

NIHEI, S.S. & CARVALHO, C.J.B. de. 2007. Phylogeny and classification of Muscini (Diptera, Muscidae). Zoological Journal of the Linnean Society, 149: 493-532.
NIHEI, S.S. & CARVALHO, C.J.B. de. 2009. The Muscini flies of the World (Diptera, Muscidae): identification key and diagnoses for genera. Zootaxa, 1976: 1-24.

Muscidae
Diptera of Europe
Taxa named by Pierre André Latreille